Tihao Chiang is an electrical engineer working for Ambarella Taiwan, Ltd., in Hsinchu, Taiwan.

Chiang was named a Fellow of the Institute of Electrical and Electronics Engineers (IEEE) in 2014 for his contributions to the theory and applications of video coding algorithms.

References

Fellow Members of the IEEE
Living people
Taiwanese electrical engineers
Year of birth missing (living people)
Place of birth missing (living people)